Zähringen may refer to:
 Zähringen, a suburb of Freiburg im Breisgau, Germany
 Zähringen castle
 House of Zähringen
 , pre-dreadnought battleship of the German Imperial Navy